CPL or Cpl may refer to:

Organizations
 CPFL Energia (NYSE: CPL), the largest non state-owned group of electric energy generation and distribution in Brazil
 CPL Aromas, a British fragrance company formerly known as Contemporary Perfumers Limited
 CPL Resources, a resourcing/placement company based in Dublin

Libraries
 Chicago Public Library, the public library system that serves the city of Chicago, Illinois, US
 Cleveland Public Library, the public library system that serves the city of Cleveland, Ohio, US
Calgary Public Library, the public library system that serves the city of Calgary, Alberta, Canada
 Coquitlam Public Library, a public library that serves Coquitlam, British Columbia, Canada
 Codices Palatini latini, the Latin section of the medieval manuscript collection in the Bibliotheca Palatina in Heidelberg.

Sports
 Canadian Premier League, a men's professional soccer league sanctioned by the Canada Soccer which represents the sport's highest level in Canada
 Caribbean Premier League, a Twenty20 cricket league
 Coastal Plain League, a wood-bat collegiate summer league
 Coastal Plain League (Class D), a former minor league baseball affiliation
 Cyberathlete Professional League, a professional sports tournament organization specializing in computer and console video game competitions

Science and technology
 Caprolactam, an organic compound with the formula (CH2)5C(O)NH
 Chemical Physics Letters, a peer-reviewed scientific journal
 Chinese Physics Letters, an open access scientific journal published in China, from the Chinese Physical Society
 Circular polarizing filter, a type of photographic filter
 Crackle Photolithography, a kind of cost efficient photolithography process using random crack template as mask.

Computing
 Call-Processing Language, a language that can be used to describe and control Internet telephony services
 Characters per line, the maximal number of monospaced characters that may appear on a single line
 Common Public License, a free software/open-source software license published by IBM
 Composition Playlist, a file that defines the playback order of a Digital Cinema Package
 Command Programming Language, a scripting language used by the PRIMOS operating system
 Complementary pass-transistor logic, one of many logic families of pass transistor logic used in the design of integrated circuits
 .cpl files, the Control Panel applets in Microsoft Windows
 CPL (programming language), a multi-paradigm programming language
 Current privilege level, of a task or program on x86 CPUs

Other uses
 Centre for Professional Learning, on the Campus The Hague of Leiden University, Netherlands
 Cents Per Line, a measurement of how much transcriptionists are paid for their work
 Certified Professional Landman, the highest designation offered to landmen in the oil/gas industry by the American Association of Professional Landmen
 Certified Professional Locksmith, a trade qualification awarded to members of the Associated Locksmiths of America
 Clavis Patrum Latinorum, a numbered list of the Latin authors in the Corpus Christianorum
 Color position light, a type of North American railroad signal
 Commercial pilot licence, a qualification that permits the holder to act and be paid as an aircraft pilot
 Concealed Pistol License, a permit for Concealed carry in the United States
 Contemporary Pictorial Literature, a 1970s comic book fanzine published by the CPL Gang
 Continuous pressure laminate, decorative laminate produced using pressure in a continuous process
 Corporal (Cpl or CPL), a rank in use in some form by most militaries and some police forces
 Cost per Lead, an online advertising pricing model
 Criminal procedure law

See also

 Communist Party of Latvia, a political party in Latvia
 Communist Party of Lithuania, a political party in Lithuania
 Communist Party of Luxembourg, more commonly known by their French (PCL) or German (KPL) initials